Alghadein is a village in western Eritrea. It is located in Dghe Subregion.

External links
Satellite map at Maplandia.com

Villages in Eritrea